Cyclohexanecarboxylic acid is the organic compound with the formula C6H11CO2H. It is the carboxylic acid of cyclohexane.  It is a colorless oil that crystallizes near room temperature.

Preparation and reactions
It is prepared by hydrogenation of benzoic acid.

Cyclohexanecarboxylic acid is a precursor to the nylon-6 precursor caprolactam via its reaction with nitrosylsulfuric acid.  It can also be oxidized to cyclohexene.  

Cyclohexanecarboxylic acid exhibits the reactions typical of carboxylic acids, including its conversion to the acid chloride cyclohexanecarbonyl chloride.

Related compounds
Derivatives related to cyclohexanecarboxylic acid include: 
 abscisic acid
 buciclic acid
 chlorogenic acid
 chorismic acid
 dicyclomine
 quinic acid
 shikimic acid
 tranexamic acid

External links

References